The 1892 United States presidential election in Minnesota took place on November 8, 1892. All contemporary 44 states were part of the 1892 United States presidential election. Minnesota voters chose nine electors to the Electoral College, which selected the president and vice president.

Minnesota was won by the Republican nominees, incumbent President Benjamin Harrison of Indiana and his running mate Whitelaw Reid of New York.

With 5.31 percent of the popular vote, Minnesota proved to be Prohibition Party candidate John Bidwell’s best performance as well as the only state where he broke 5 percent of the vote.

Results

Results by county

Notes

References

Minnesota
1892
1892 Minnesota elections